Chowdhury Nafeez Sarafat is a Bangladeshi businessman connected to the Awami League government. Sarafat is the founder chairman of the board of trustees of Canadian University of Bangladesh. He is the chairman of Padma Bank Limited.

Early life 
Sarafat is from Gopalganj District.

Career 

Sarafat is the founding chairman of Canadian University of Bangladesh. The university awards Sarafat Chowdhury Merit Scholarship.

Sarafat received his Doctorate in Business Administration from Commonwealth University-London on 15 December 2016. The online university is not credited and the degree not recognized. In January 2018, Sarafat was appointed chairman of Farmers Bank Limited, later renamed to Padma Bank, after its chairman Muhiuddin Khan Alamgir resigned over allegations of embezzling from the bank.

In 2021, Sarafat and Muhiuddin Khan Alamgir accused each other of being corrupt. Alamgir, who is a shareholder of Padma Bank, asked Bangladesh Bank to investigate a loan of a billion taka to Strategic Equity Management allegedly owned by Sarafat. In October 2021, Benoit Prefontaine, Canadian High Commissioner to Bangladesh, laid the foundation stone for the permanent campus of Canadian University of Bangladesh in Purbachal in a ceremony presided by Sarafat. The plot, initially earmarked for a school, for the university had been allocated in violation of government rules by RAJUK. Mohammad A. Arafat is chief adviser to the board of trustees.

In 2022, Sarafat became a director of the National Tea Company Limited. He is a member of the executive committee of Bangladesh Association of Banks. He is a major shareholder of RACE Asset Management. He is the Managing Director of Unique Meghnaghat Power Limited, a subsidiary of Unique group. Ahmed Kabir Kishore was arrested under Digital Security Act for drawing cartoons critical of the government including one where he portrayed Sarafat as a bank embezzler. He is the Head of Consumer Banking of ICB Islamic Bank Limited.

Sarafat owns RACE Portfolio and Issue Management which was one of the issue manager in the aborted attempt to list Best Holdings Limited whose permission was denied by Bangladesh Bank. Another issue manager, the government owned ICB Capital Management, denied any involvement with the company. He is a director of Unique Hotel and Resorts Limited, which owns Westin Dhaka. He and his wife are directors of Race Financial Management Inc. and Can-Ban Chambers House, based in Canada.

Personal life 

Sarafat is married to Anjuman Ara Shahid. She served as the chairman of Strategic Finance and Investment Limited and later director of Southeast Bank. She is the Vice-Chairman of Canadian University of Bangladesh. She owns shares of Padma Bank. Their request to make their son, Chowdhury Rahib Sarafat, a director of Southeast Bank was denied by Bangladesh Bank as he was under 20.

References 

Living people
Bangladeshi businesspeople
Bangladeshi bankers
People from Gopalganj District, Bangladesh
Year of birth missing (living people)